Vitucci is a surname of Italian origin. Notable people with this surname include:

 Francesco Vitucci (born 1963), Italian basketball head coach
 Giuseppe Vitucci (born 1950), Italian wrestler
 Nick Vitucci (born 1967), a former professional ice hockey goaltender

See also 
 Viti (disambiguation)

it:Vitucci